Technical documentation is a generic term for the classes of information created to describe (in technical language) the use, functionality or architecture of a product, system or service.

Classes of technical documentation
Classes of technical documentation may include:
 patents
 specifications of item or of components/materials
 data sheets of item or of components/materials
 test methods
 manufacturing standards
 system requirements
 system architecture
 system design documents and data including those necessary for the system development, testing, manufacturing, operation and maintenance

Standardizing technical documentation
Historically, most classes of technical documentation lacked universal conformity (standards) for format, content and structure. Standards are being developed to redress this through bodies such as the International Organization for Standardization(ISO), which has published standards relating to rules for preparation of user guides, manuals, product specifications, etc. for technical product documentation. These standards are covered by ICS 01.110.  Technical product documentation not covered by ICS 01.110 are listed in the subsection below.

Discipline-specific
 ISO 15787
 ISO 3098
 ISO 10209
 ISO 2162
 ISO 5457
ISO 6433

EU Medical Device Regulation 
A technical documentation is also required for medical devices following EU medical device regulation.
Annex II, Technical documentation, and Annex III, Technical documentation on post-market surveillance, of the regulation describe the content of a technical documentation for a medical device.
This includes e.g. information on the device specification, labelling and instructions, design and manufacture, safety and performance requirements, risk management, and the validatain and verfification of the device, including the clinical evaluation; and also information from postmarketing surveillance.

Formats for source data
 Darwin Information Typing Architecture (DITA)
 DocBook
 S1000D
 reStructuredText

Documentation architecture and typing
Some documentation systems are concerned with the overall types or forms of documentation that constitute a documentation set, as well as (or rather than) how the documentation is produced, published or formatted.

For example, the Diátaxis framework (which is mostly used in the field of software documentation ) posits four distinct documentation forms, corresponding to four different user needs: tutorials, how-to guides, reference and explanation. By contrast, DITA asserts five different "topic types": Task, Concept, Reference, Glossary Entry, and Troubleshooting, while RedHat's Modular Documentation system uses three "modules": Concept, Procedure and Reference.

See also
 Document management system
 Method engineering
 Network documentation
 Technical communication
 Technical editing
 Technical file

Citations

Documents
Technical communication